David Salter is an English actor and theatre director. His productions include Life of Galileo (Studio Theatre, Washington, D.C. and Battersea Arts Centre), The Comedy of Errors (Cambridge Shakespeare Festival), Playing Sinatra (New End Theatre) and Ghetto (Pleasance Theatre). 

He worked as an associate director to Peter Stein on the West End production of David Harrower's Blackbird (Albery Theatre). He has also worked as an associate at the Almeida Theatre. 

In 2006, he wrote and directed Broadway in the Shadows, a play based on the works of O. Henry, at the Grand Théâtre de Luxembourg and the Arcola Theatre in London.

He is a regular director at various drama schools including RADA and the Drama Centre in London, as well as Head of Manchester Metropolitan University's School of Theatre.

References

Theatre Record and its annual Indexes
David Salter's programme CVs

English theatre directors
Living people
Place of birth missing (living people)
Year of birth missing (living people)